Alberta Provincial Highway No. 2A is the designation of six alternate routes off Highway 2 in Alberta, Canada. In general, these are original sections of Highway 2, such as the southern portion of Macleod Trail in Calgary. They passed through communities before limited-access freeways were built to shorten driving distance, accommodate heavier volumes and to bypass city traffic. Portions of the alignment of Highway 2A follow the route of the former Calgary and Edmonton Trail.

High River – Calgary 
Highway 2A currently begins in the Town of High River and follows 12 Avenue SE and Centre Street before passing by Aldersyde and intersecting Highway 7. The highway then travels westward to the Town of Okotoks, where it branches north and follows Southridge Drive and Northridge Drive through Okotoks before rejoining Highway 2 near De Winton. In 2003, it was extended north by sharing a common alignment with Highway 2 for  until it splits to Deerfoot Trail (Highway 2) Macleod Trail (Highway 2A) and ends in the City of Calgary at Stoney Trail (Highway 201). Macleod Trail continues north into downtown Calgary but does not carry a highway designation.

Major intersections

Central Alberta 

Highway 2A runs adjacent to the Queen Elizabeth II Highway between Calgary and Edmonton, although it does not enter either city.  Highway 2A generally runs parallel to the Canadian Pacific Railway Calgary-Edmonton line, which runs to the west of Highway 2 between Crossfield and Red Deer, and to the east of Highway 2 between Red Deer and Leduc.  Highway 2A is divided into two subsections with a  gap between Bowden and Innisfail.

The first subsection of Highway 2A starts at the Highway 2 / Highway 72 interchange (Exit 295) and passes through the town of Crossfield, town of Carstairs, and by the town of Didsbury before entering the town of Olds along 46 Avenue and intersects Highway 27 (46 Street).  The highway continues north to the town of Bowden before terminating at Highway 587, just west of Highway 2 (Exit 357).

The second subsection begins in the town of Innisfail at Highway 590 (50 Street), just west of Highway 2 (Exit 368), along 42 Avenue. The highway continues north and passes through the town of Penhold before entering the city of Red Deer along Taylor Drive. The highway turns east along 19 Street and then north along Gaetz Avenue.  Highway 2A splits into one-way couplets through downtown Red Deer, with northbound traffic following 49 Avenue and southbound traffic following portions of Gaetz Avenue and 51 Avenue.  After crossing the Red Deer River, the one-way streets rejoin and intersect Highway 11 (67 Street) and Highway 11A, which forms Red Deer's northern city limit.  The highway continues north through the town of Blackfalds and city of Lacombe.  North of Lacombe, the highway rejoins Highway 2 and share the same alignment for  before the highway branches northeast and passes through hamlet of Morningside, town of Ponoka, and hamlet of Maskwacis. The highway enters the city of Wetaskiwin along 56 Street and continues north through the town of Millet, by the hamlet of Kavanagh, and before it rejoins Highway 2 (Exit 516) in the city of Leduc.

Major intersections

Smith 

Highway 2A, known as Highway 2A:44 by Alberta Transportation, begins Highway 2 near the hamlet of Hondo and connects with hamlet of Smith.

Major intersections

High Prairie 

Prior to 1990, this section was signed as Highway 2 but was renumbered at the same time that Highway 34 was renumbered to Highway 43 (present day Highway 49) north of the Town of Valleyview.

This segment of Highway 2A is considered an alternate route of the Northern Woods and Water Route.

Major intersections

Grimshaw 

Major intersections

Former alignments

Barlow Trail 

In the 1960s, Highway 2 entered north Calgary along Barlow Trail; however in 1971 Highway 2 was realigned to the newly constructed Blackfoot Trail freeway (later renamed Deerfoot Trail). Direct access from Barlow Trail to Blackfoot Trail was closed to make room for the 17 Avenue SE / Blackfoot Trail / Deerfoot Trail interchange.

The Highway 2A designation was phased out in the mid-1980s and the Barlow Trail between 48 Avenue NE (just north of McKnight Boulevard) and the main terminal access was closed to allow for additional runway construction.

High River – Cayley 

See also 

Transportation in Calgary

References 

002A
Northern Woods and Water Route
Lacombe, Alberta
Leduc, Alberta
Ponoka, Alberta
Roads in Calgary
Transport in Red Deer, Alberta
High River
Okotoks